Overton Recreational Football Club is a Welsh football club based in Overton-on-Dee, Wrexham County Borough. Founded in 1998, they currently play in the North East Wales Football League Championship.

History
The club joined the newly formed North East Wales Football League in 2020 as a Premier Division club.

Honours
Division 1 League Cup Winners: 2006–07
Division 1 Runners Up: 2006–07

References

Football clubs in Wales
Welsh National League (Wrexham Area) Premier Division clubs
Football clubs in Wrexham
Sport in Wrexham County Borough
Association football clubs established in 1998
1998 establishments in Wales
North East Wales Football League clubs